In enzymology, an uridine phosphorylase is an enzyme that catalyzes the chemical reaction

uridine + phosphate  uracil + alpha-D-ribose 1-phosphate

Thus, the two substrates of this enzyme are uridine and phosphate, whereas its two products are uracil and alpha-D-ribose 1-phosphate.

This enzyme belongs to the family of glycosyltransferases, specifically the pentosyltransferases.  The systematic name of this enzyme class is uridine:phosphate alpha-D-ribosyltransferase. Other names in common use include pyrimidine phosphorylase, UrdPase, UPH, and UPase.  This enzyme participates in pyrimidine metabolism.

Structural studies

References

 
 
 

EC 2.4.2
Enzymes of known structure